José Armando Santa Cruz (born August 29, 1980) is a Mexican former professional boxer. He is a former WBC interim lightweight champion, losing this title on August 12, 2006 to David Díaz. He is the brother of boxing star Léo Santa Cruz.

Professional career
Jose turned professional in 2000, he won his pro debut by knocking out Penpak Chokchai. He would go on to compile a record of 22-1 before facing and defeating Japanese boxer Chikashi Inada, to win the interim WBC lightweight title. He would lose the title in his next fight to David Diaz.

Professional boxing record

See also
Notable boxing families

References

External links

 

|-

 

1980 births
Living people
Mexican male boxers
Boxers from Michoacán
Lightweight boxers